(sub nom Quistclose Investments Ltd v Rolls Razor Ltd) is a leading property, unjust enrichment and trusts case, which invented a new species of proprietary interest in English law. A "Quistclose trust" arises when an asset is given to somebody for a specific purpose and if, for whatever reason, the purpose for the transfer fails, the transferor may take back the asset.

If a debtor undertakes to use the loan in a particular way and segregates the creditor's money from his general assets, and the debtor becomes insolvent, the creditor's money is refundable and is not available to pay the debtor's other creditors. If the trust fails (because the purpose is not or cannot be fulfilled), the sums become subject to a resulting trust in favour of the person who originally advanced the credit and the person to whom the sums were advanced holds them as trustee.

Facts
Rolls Razor Ltd owed £484,000 to Barclays Bank Ltd. It still needed more money to pay a dividend, which it had declared to its shareholders on 2 July 1964. Quistclose Investments Ltd agreed to a loan of £209,719 8s 6d on the conditions that the dividend would be paid with it and the money would be put in a separate account (also with Barclays Bank). The money was paid into the account, but before the dividend was distributed, Rolls Razor Ltd went into voluntary liquidation. Quistclose sought to recover the money, contending that its agreement meant Rolls Razor Ltd held the money on trust. Barclays contended that the account was part of the general assets of the company and that it was entitled to exercise a set-off of the money in the account against the debts that Rolls Razor owed with respect of Barclays.

Judgment

The House of Lords (with the leading judgment being given by Lord Wilberforce) unanimously held that the money was held by Rolls Razor on trust for the payment of the dividends; that purpose having failed, the money was held on trust for Quistclose. The fact that the transaction was a loan did not exclude the implication of a trust. The legal rights (to call for repayment) and equitable rights (to claim title) could co-exist. Barclays, having notice of the trust, could not retain the money as against Quistclose. Similarly, the liquidator of Rolls Razor could not claim title to the money, as the assets did not form part the beneficial estate of Rolls Razor. Lord Reid, Lord Morris of Borth-Y-Gest, Lord Guest and Lord Pearce all agreed with the judgment that Lord Wilberforce gave.

Significance

The conceptual analysis underpinning Quistclose trusts was the source of some debate. Shortly after the decision, an article appeared in the Law Quarterly Review, written by Peter Millett QC, suggesting how the traditional trust need for certainty of objects (beneficiary) could be squared with the decision of the House of Lords and the refusal to accept new categories of purpose trust in equity. In Twinsectra Ltd v Yardley, the House of Lords reviewed the law, and the leading judgment was given by Lord Millett, whose judicial analysis unsurprisingly closely mirrored what he had suggested twenty years previously.

The key issue, according to Lord Millett, in upholding the trust concept is ascertaining where the beneficial interest in the money lies. Lord Millett suggests that there are four possible answers: (1) the lender, (2) the borrower, (3) the ultimate purpose and (4) no one in the sense that the beneficial interest remains "in suspense". Lord Millett then analysed all of the foregoing, and determined that the beneficial interest remains with the lender until the purpose for which the funds are lent is fulfilled. The only other reasoned decision was Lord Hoffmann, who agreed with Lord Millett but disagreed as to whether it was an express or resulting trust.

Some have suggested that a Quistclose trust is indubitably a trust but would not be a resulting trust as the beneficial interest never 'results back' to the lender; it was with him all the time. However, others point out that there are many resulting trusts whose beneficial interest never leaves the donor, such as the classic example of a trust failing for uncertain objects.

Requirements
It is sometimes argued that Quistclose trusts are not a separate species of trust at all but merely a simple trust that has certain characteristics. However, Quistclose trusts are often regarded as somewhat special and distinct. The English Court of Appeal, in Twinsectra Ltd v Yardley [1999] Lloyd's Rep 438, suggested obiter dictum that it was in fact a 'quasi-trust', which is not required to satisfy "the usually strict requirements for a valid trust so far as 'certainty of object[s]' is concerned. However, the House of Lords, on appeal, declined to endorse those comments.

Purpose
However, what differentiates the Quistclose trust from other trusts is the existence of the specific purpose for which the sums on credit must be applied and the failure of which gives rise to the trust. It must also be clear that if that specific purpose fails, the sums will revert to the person who originally advanced them.

The situations in which Quistclose trusts have been upheld are varied. They have been upheld in cases of:
sums advanced for the specific payment of a dividend;
sums advanced for the specific payment of a creditor;
sums advanced on the basis of an undertaking for a specific project; and
advance payments made on credit for the purchase of specific goods.

One issue that has to date escaped notice in the judicial consideration of Quistclose trusts is how narrowly the purpose has to be defined. Suggestions have been made to the effect that the general law in relation to powers would apply (such that if the purpose is sufficiently well defined to be a power, a Quistclose trust may arise), but others have argued that to take tests from one branch of the law and apply it to another may not be appropriate. The lower courts in Twinsectra suggested that the purpose must be sufficiently well defined, but Lord Millett distanced himself from that position by claiming that "uncertainty works in favour of the lender, not the borrower".

Certainty of intention
In Twinsectra v Yardley, Lord Millett spent some time considering the necessary intention. It has long been settled law that a person need not have a specific intention to create an express trust so long as the court can determine from the person's intention that a beneficial entitlement should be conferred which the law (or equity) will enforce. Thus, in Twinsectra, where there was a solicitor's undertaking that the money should be used for only one purpose, that was held to be sufficient intent. In Quistclose itself and in Carreras Rothmans v Freeman Mathews Treasure, where loans were made for a specific purpose, this may also amount to sufficient intention. If a loan is advanced for the borrower to use as he will, no Quistclose trust can arise.

Criticisms
In the early stages of development of the Quistclose trust, it was suggested that the concept was unambiguously good. In Re Kayford, it was suggested that a segregated account for customers' money to be placed in to guard against the insolvency of the company was a proper and responsible thing to do.

However, more recently, criticism has been mounted that giving a proprietary claim to a lender that enables the lender to reclaim the loan ahead of unsecured creditors has the effect of putting the lender in the position of a secured creditor, but without the need to register any security interest against the borrower (and thus meaning that other creditors would not be aware of the preferential status of the lender's claim).

Quistclose trusts still remain relatively uncommon, and as yet, there has been no clamour for legislation or regulation (Quistclose trusts were not even addressed under English law when the insolvency law was last revised in the Enterprise Act 2002).  However, should the courts start finding them with increasing frequency, it may be that regulation, or judicial revision, follows.

See also

 Beneficial interest
 Spendthrift trust
 Totten trust

Notes

References
 William Swadling, "The Quistclose trust" (2004) 
 For a description (in French) from a civil lawyer point of view, see "Le controle de l'entreprise par ses fournisseurs de credit dans les droits francais et anglais", These, Panthéon-Assas University, 2007

Wills and trusts in the United Kingdom
English property case law
English trusts case law
Lord Wilberforce cases
House of Lords cases
1968 in British law
1968 in case law
Quistclose